Della Casa is a surname. Notable people with the surname include:

 Giovanni della Casa (1503–1556), Italian poet
 Lisa Della Casa (1919–2012), Swiss soprano
 Roberto Della Casa (born 1942), Italian actor
 Della Casa Appa (1889–1963), one of the first significant Zuni women jewelers